O Cangaceiro do Futuro (The Cangaceriro of the Future; American title Time Hustler) is a Brazilian comedy series expected expected to debut in 2022 directed by Halder Gomes and Glauber Filho, with screenplay by Chico Amorim, Paulo Leierer, Clara Deak, Lucas de Rosa, and Halder Gomes. It is produced by Mayra Lucas and Carolina Alckmin, by GLAZ Entertainment. The series has seven episodes and will be appear on Netflix.

Plot 
The series begins in 2021, where Virguley lives tight with the bills and without morals in São Paulo. He makes presentations in the capital as Lampião, because of his resemblance to the famous bandit (cangaçeiro) of the early 1900s. He wants to become a millionaire and return to the Northeast. When he gets involved in a fight, he is hit on the head and transported to the year 1927, in the middle of the cangaço, and is mistaken by the population for Lampião. Taking advantage of this confusion, Virguley begins to act as if he were the real king of cangaço and decides to gather a group to gain power in the town and take advantage of the situation, until he meets the real Virgulino Ferreira da Silva, Lampião.

Production 
The series started to be shot in Quixadá, Ceará in November 2021, wrapping in February 2022 in São Paulo. Part of the shoot was made in a mini scenic city still in Quixadá, built for the series due to the COVID-19 pandemic. The project is part of Netflix's Mais Brasil na Tela which brings to the platform more series produced in the country and develops the Brazilian market. Director Gomes said, "It's a joy to bring a cultural and historical icon from the Northeast to the rest of Brazil and the world. The era of these outlaws is an endless source of inspiration, and I've long wanted to create a comedy about this moment in time"

The series will be released in 2022 in 7, 30-minute episodes, with production from GLAZ Entertainment.

Cast and characters

References

External links 

 

2020s Brazilian television series
Portuguese-language Netflix original programming
Television shows set in São Paulo
Television series set in the 1920s